2-Phospho-L-lactate guanylyltransferase (CofC, MJ0887) is an enzyme with systematic name GTP:2-phospho-L-lactate guanylyltransferase. This enzyme catalyses the following chemical reaction

 (2S)-2-phospholactate + GTP  (2S)-lactyl-2-diphospho-5'-guanosine + diphosphate

This enzyme is involved in the biosynthesis of coenzyme F420.

References

External links 
 

EC 2.7.7